"SMS" is a song by Aya Nakamura. It was released on 1 December 2022. It features on Nakamura's album DNK.

Charts

References

2022 songs
2022 singles
Aya Nakamura songs